The 2013–14 Liga Portuguesa de Basquetebol (LPB) season was the 81 season of the highest professional basketball league in Portugal. Benfica won their 25th league title, while Vitória S.C. were runners-up.

Standings

Playoffs

Statistical leaders

Points

Rebounds

Assists

Liga Portuguesa de Basquetebol seasons
Portuguese
LPB